Muscicapa is a genus of passerine birds belonging to the Old World flycatcher family Muscicapidae, and therein to the typical flycatchers of subfamily Muscicapinae. They are widespread across Europe, Africa and Asia with most species occurring in forest and woodland habitats. Several species are migratory, moving south from Europe and northern Asia for the winter.

They are small birds,  in length. They have a large head, short tail and a flattened bill, broader at the base. Their plumage is mostly drab brown or grey and rather plain. Young birds tend to be more spotted or mottled.

Muscicapa flycatchers typically feed on flying insects which are caught by sallying out from an exposed perch. The nest is usually cup-shaped and built on a tree branch but some African species nest in tree holes.

Taxonomy and systematics
The genus was introduced by the French zoologist Mathurin Jacques Brisson in 1760 with the spotted flycatcher (Muscicapa striata) as the type species. The word Muscicapa comes from the Latin musca, a fly and capere, to catch.

In 2010 two large molecular phylogenetic studies of species within Muscicapidae showed that Muscicapa was non-monophyletic. The authors were unable to propose a revised genus as not all the species were sampled. A subsequent study published in 2016 included 37 of the 42 Muscicapini species. It confirmed that Muscicapa was non-monophyletic and proposed a reorganised arrangement with several new or resurrected genera.

Extant species
There are 26 extant species of Muscicapa flycatchers:

Extinct species
There are at least two fossil species which are included in this genus:
 †Muscicapa miklosi (Late Miocene of Polgárdi, Hungary)
 †Muscicapa petenyii (Pliocene of Beremend, Hungary)

Former species
Formerly, some authorities also considered the following species (or subspecies) as species within the genus Muscicapa:
 Red-backed fairywren (as Muscicapa melanocephala)
 Australian golden whistler (as Muscicapa pectoralis)
 New Caledonian whistler (as Muscicapa caledonica)
 Rufous whistler (xanthetraea) (as Muscicapa xanthetraea)
 Little shrikethrush (as Muscicapa megarhyncha)
 Black-naped monarch (as Muscicapa azurea)
 Blue-mantled crested flycatcher (as Muscicapa cyanomelas)
 African paradise flycatcher (as Muscicapa viridis)
 Mascarene paradise flycatcher (as Muscicapa bourbonnensis)
 Hawaiʻi ʻelepaio (as Muscicapa sandwichensis)
 Tahiti monarch (as Muscicapa nigra)
 †Maupiti monarch (as Muscicapa Pomarea)
 Chuuk monarch (as Muscicapa Rugensis)
 Spot-winged monarch (as Muscicapa guttula)
 Hooded monarch (as Muscicapa manadensis)
 Island monarch (as Muscicapa inornata)
 Black-faced monarch (as Muscicapa melanopsis)
 Golden monarch (as Muscicapa chrysomela)
 Frilled monarch (as Muscicapa telescopthalmus)
 Shining flycatcher (chalybeocephala) (as Muscicapa chalybeocephalus)
 Black-capped bulbul (as Muscicapa melanictera)
 Light-vented bulbul (as Muscicapa sinensis)
 Yellow-vented bulbul (as Muscicapa goiavier)

References

Further reading

 del Hoyo, Josep; Elliott, Andrew & Sargatal, Jordi (eds.) (2006): Handbook of Birds of the World (Vol. 11: Old World Flycatchers to Old World Warblers). Lynx Edicions, Barcelona.  (Vol.11: 2006)
 Perrins, Christopher (ed.) (2004): The New Encyclopedia of Birds. Oxford University Press, Oxford. 
 Sinclair, Ian; Ryan, Pete; Christy, Patrice & Hockey, Phil (2003): Birds of Africa: a complete illustrated field guide to the birds of the Sahara. Struik, Cape Town. 

 
Bird genera